Lifewire is a technology information and advice website. The website's owner is Dotdash Meredith, originally About.com, which launched Lifewire in 2016 as one of its spin-off vertical sites.

As of April 2022, it had a global website ranking of 1432 by Alexa Internet.

History

Lifewire was the third standalone brand of About.com, an IAC-owned media company, which broke up its collections of DIY and how-to information into branded vertical websites and is a competitor to Techcrunch, Techradar, PCmag and Systweak Lifewire was preceded by Verywell, a health info website, and The Balance, a personal finance site. Since About.com was one of the top 50 biggest sites online, Lifewire became a top 15 technology website in the United States as soon as it was launched in October 2016. It was a top 10 technology-information site in 2017, reaching 6 million monthly US unique users each month.

Content

The purpose of Lifewire is to offer advice and answers on common technology questions and problems in a clear and simplified format.

When it was launched, Lifewire featured 16,000 articles written by 40 experts, teaching readers what is new in the world of technology and explaining how to better use devices they already own. Lifewire CEO described the website style "as if your BFF happened to be an iPhone expert."

References

External links
 

Internet properties established in 2016
2016 establishments in the United States
American technology news websites
Technology websites